Eulima riss is a species of sea snail, a marine gastropod mollusk in the family Eulimidae. The species is one of a number within the genus Eulima.

References

External links
 To World Register of Marine Species

riss
Gastropods described in 1835